"If Hollywood Don't Need You (Honey I Still Do)" is a song written by Bob McDill, and recorded by American country music artist Don Williams.  It was released in November 1982 as the third single from the album Listen to the Radio.  The song was Williams' thirteenth number one single on the country chart. The single went to number one for one week and spent a total of twelve weeks on the chart.

Content
The song contains a tribute to Burt Reynolds saying: "Oh, and if you see Burt Reynolds would you shake his hand for me / And tell ol' Burt I've seen all his movies / Well, I hope you make the big time, I hope your dreams come true / But if Hollywood don't need you, honey, I still do"

Charts

Weekly charts

Year-end charts

References

1982 songs
Don Williams songs
1982 singles
Songs written by Bob McDill
Song recordings produced by Garth Fundis
MCA Records singles